System Image Utility is an application for making NetBoot and other image sets to be used with Mac OS X Server.  It is available as part of the server admin tools package on a disc with the server software and as a download from Apple's website. There are several third-party applications that perform similar functions.

See also 

 Network Image Utility

External links 

 Mac OS X server page
 Apple Server Admin Tools 10.7.5
 Apple Server Admin Tools 10.6.8
  Apple Server Admin Tools 10.5.7
 Apple Server Admin Tools 10.4.7
 Apple - Support - Downloads - Server Admin Tools (search for all versions)

MacOS-only software made by Apple Inc.
MacOS Server